The Covenant Network is a network of Catholic radio stations in the Midwestern United States. Covenant maintains 15 full-power radio stations and a further 25 dependent translators in Illinois, Indiana, Louisiana, Missouri, Nebraska and Oklahoma.

The Covenant Network maintains studios in St. Louis, Missouri, where it owns two AM stations feeding three FM translators. Covenant stations carry EWTN Radio programming as well as network productions and other Catholic radio shows.

History
Covenant was the brainchild of Tony and Teresa Holman, who met in St. Louis and felt a calling to share their faith. After looking for stations to buy, Covenant Network began broadcasting May 1, 1997, on WRYT, licensed to Edwardsville, Illinois. After using the Illinois studios acquired from WRYT, Covenant bought a former dance studio on Hampton Avenue in St. Louis and began producing programming. In 1998, Covenant acquired its second station, the former WTIM in Taylorville, Illinois, and renamed it WIHM.

In 2005, Covenant added a second frequency in the St. Louis area when it acquired KIRL in St. Charles, Missouri and relaunched it as KHOJ.

In 2019, Covenant agreed to purchase WQNA in Springfield, Illinois, from Capital Area Career Center for $47,000; Covenant was already heard there on two translators.

Stations
Covenant Network owns 16 full-power stations and 25 dependent translators:

References

External links
Covenant Network website

1997 establishments in Missouri
Christian radio stations in the United States
Catholic radio
Christian mass media companies